El Borma  is an airport serving the El Borma town and its oil fields in Tunisia.

See also
Transport in Tunisia

References

 OurAirports - Tunisia
  Great Circle Mapper - El Borma
 El Borma
 Google Earth

Airports in Tunisia